Five Towns College is a private college in Dix Hills, New York. The college's degree programs focus on music, media, and the performing arts.

History
Founded in 1972, Five Towns College holds an Absolute Charter issued by the New York State Board of Regents. The college's name comes from the original proposed campus, which was to be in Lawrence in southwestern Nassau County, New York, an area known as "The Five Towns". However, the college never opened in that location. Its first campus was in Merrick, New York (1973–1982). Its second campus was in Seaford, New York (1982–1992). The college acquired its permanent home in Dix Hills in 1992 and relocated there for the fall 1992 semester.

Academics
The college offers associate, bachelor, master's and doctoral degree programs through eight academic divisions. These include music performance, theatre arts, mass communications, film and television, business management, liberal arts, interactive media arts, and music teacher education. Popular majors include audio recording technology, broadcasting, musical theatre, music performance, and business administration and management.

It was the first in New York State to offer a program which focused on jazz and commercial music. It was also the first to offer a program in audio recording technology as well as music business.

Its programs of study are registered by the New York State Education Department.  The college is institutionally accredited by the Middle States Commission on Higher Education (MSCHE). It also holds programmatic accreditation by the National Council for Accreditation of Teacher Education (NCATE/CAEP) and by the National Association of Schools of Music (NASM).

Student life
Approximately one-third of Five Towns College students reside on-campus in the college's Living/Learning Center - a complex of four residence halls with private bathrooms, student center and music practice rooms. The college is also home to the John Lennon Center for music and technology. The JLC is home to a suite of sound recording studios, film sound stage, interactive computer graphics lab, and student run radio station WFTU. The college is also equipped with a MIDI Studio, film editing Lab, and piano/keyboard Lab.

The Five Towns College Performing Arts Center is a fully rigged main stage theatre, with seating for 600. The college also includes a black box style playhouse, costume shop, and set design and construction workshop. Through its Theatre Arts Division. the college produces a variety of Broadway-style theatre productions each year, including musicals, dramas, and comedies. Through its Film/Video Division, students produce a variety of motion picture projects, including narrative, experimental and short films. The college annually hosts the Long Island Media Arts Show, The Luminary Student Film Awards, and the Long Island 48-hour Film Festival, among many others.

The Lorraine Kleinman and Stanley G. Cohen Memorial Library/Learning Resource Center (L/LRC) includes an extensive digital and bound collection of materials that support the academic programs. It also includes an Educational Technology Center for the training and development of online learning skills for both students and faculty.  Additional support services include Wellness Counseling, Academic Advisement, and Tutoring Services. The college also has a professional Student Success Center, which supports the academic goals of students with documented learning disabilities pursuant to the American's With Disabilities Act (ADA). Five Towns College also offers the only Higher Education Opportunity Program (HEOP) on Long Island, which provides additional support services for students who are designated as both academically and economically disadvantaged by the New York State Education Department.

Athletics
The Five Towns College Sound Athletic Department is a member of the United States Collegiate Athletic Association (USCAA). It competes as a full member of the Hudson Valley Intercollegiate Athletic Conference (HVIAC). The college's mascot is Fader the Seagull. 

The college offers men's and women's basketball, volleyball, and soccer.  In 2021 it began to offer competition in esports and cross country. In 2022 the department announced that it would offer men's and women's lacrosse. 

Home games are broadcast from Studio 400, the college's television lab.

Media
Scripted video productions are produced through the college's Film/Television Center.

The college operates a broadcast transmission facility for its FCC-licensed radio station at Riverhead, NY under the call sign WFTU.

The station broadcasts at 1570 AM and streams over the Internet. On May 16, 2018, Five Towns obtained a permit from the FCC to construct a broadcast translator in order to begin FM broadcast operations at the frequency 104.9. However, though the translator has been licensed, the college has yet to begin public FM transmission.

Notable alumni 

Nicole Albino of Nina Sky
Jon Bellion, songwriter and producer
Jesse Carmichael, keyboardist and guitarist of Maroon 5
Julian Casablancas, lead singer of The Strokes
Jared Cotter, songwriter and television personality
Kota the Friend, rapper and singer-songwriter
Wyclef Jean, rapper and producer of The Fugees
Adam Levine, lead singer of Maroon 5
Olivia Longott, R&B singer
, Oscar-nominated writer of Raise It Up (August Rush song)
Chrisette Michele, recording artist
Christian Nilsson, filmmaker best known for Dashcam (2021) and Unsubscribe (2020)
Joe Satriani, rock guitarist with 15 Grammy nominations
Earnest Woodall, composer and guitarist

References

External links
Official website

Universities and colleges in Suffolk County, New York
Music schools in New York (state)
Business schools in New York (state)
Liberal arts colleges in New York (state)
Educational institutions established in 1972
For-profit universities and colleges in the United States
For-profit music schools in the United States
1972 establishments in New York (state)
Universities and colleges on Long Island
Long Island
Private universities and colleges in New York (state)